= Shining Hospital Pokhara =

Hospital in Nepal

Shining Hospital was the first proper hospital in the city of Pokhara started in 1952 by Dr. O’Hanlon and Hilda Steele, with four expatriate colleagues and five Nepali Christians, including David and Premi Mukhia, It was located in Tundikhel.
